Sir Augustus Rivers Thompson KCSI CIE (12 September 1829 – 27 November 1890) was a British colonial administrator who served as Chief Commissioner of the British Crown Colony of Burma from April 1875 to March 1878. He was Lieutenant-Governor of Bengal between 1882 and 1887.

Thompson was appointed a CSI in 1877, a CIE in 1883 and knighted with the KCSI in 1885. 

He was president of the executive committee of the Calcutta International Exhibition (1883-1884). He established the R.T. Girls' High School in Suri, Birbhum.

He died of pneumonia in Gibraltar.

References

Further reading

Administrators in British Burma
1829 births
1890 deaths
Knights Commander of the Order of the Star of India
Companions of the Order of the Indian Empire
Lieutenant-governors of Bengal
People educated at Haileybury and Imperial Service College
Members of the Council of the Governor General of India
Indian Civil Service (British India) officers